Austromuellera is a genus of only two known species of medium-sized trees, constituting part of the plant family Proteaceae. They are both endemic to three restricted areas of the wet tropics rainforests of north-eastern Queensland, Australia. The genus was named in 1930 in honour of Ferdinand von Mueller by Cyril T. White. They lie within the tribe Banksieae within the family Proteaceae, their closest relatives the genera Musgravea and Banksia.

Species
 Austromuellera trinervia , 1930 (type species)
 Austromuellera valida , 1999

References

 
Endemic flora of Queensland
Proteales of Australia
Proteaceae genera
Wet Tropics of Queensland